Derek Harry McCorquindale (born 1933), is a male former athlete who competed for England.

Athletics career
He represented England in the shot put at the 1958 British Empire and Commonwealth Games in Cardiff, Wales.

References

1933 births
English male shot putters
Athletes (track and field) at the 1958 British Empire and Commonwealth Games
Living people
Commonwealth Games competitors for England